The 1836 United States presidential election in Louisiana took place between November 3 and December 7, 1836, as part of the 1836 United States presidential election. Voters chose five representatives, or electors to the Electoral College, who voted for President and Vice President.

Louisiana voted for the Democratic candidate, Martin Van Buren, over Whig candidate Hugh White. Van Buren won Louisiana by a narrow margin of 3.48%.

Results

See also
 United States presidential elections in Louisiana

References

Louisiana
1836
1836 Louisiana elections